The Seventy-fifth session of the United Nations General Assembly was the session of the United Nations General Assembly which ran from 16 September 2020 to 15 September 2021. The President for the session was Volkan Bozkır, who stated that the session's theme was "The future we want, the United Nations we need; reaffirming our collective commitment to multilateralism".

Organisation for the session

President 
On 17 June 2020, Turkish diplomat, and former Minister of European Union Affairs, Volkan Bozkır was elected as President of the United Nations General Assembly. He was the sole candidate for the post and was elected by an overwhelming majority.

In his vision statement, Bozkır laid out some of his priorities for the session. Specifically, he pledged to underline the irreplaceable nature of the rules-based international system and of multilateralism, with the theme of the 75th session being selected as: "The future we want, the United Nations we need; reaffirming our collective commitment to multilateralism." He further pledged to give a voice to the most vulnerable, namely, refugees, immigrants, and stateless persons through the UN. In regard to the 2030 Agenda, he pledged to strengthen global partnership, paying special attention to Least Developed Countries that are falling behind on meeting their SDG obligations. Finally, he stated his commitment to improving the living standards and rights of women around the world by strengthening their status within society, and of achieving gender parity at all levels at the UN.

Vice-Presidents 
The General Assembly elected the following countries as the vice-presidents of the 75th session:

The five permanent members of the Security Council:

 
 
 
 
 

As well as the following nations:

Committees 
The following were elected Chairs and Officers of the General Assembly's Main Committees for the 75th Session:

Seat allocation 
As is tradition before each session of the General Assembly, the Secretary-General drew lots to see which member state would occupy the first seat in the General Assembly Chamber, with the other member states following according to the English translation of their name. For the 75th Session, Iceland was selected to sit in the first seat by Secretary-General António Guterres. This same order is followed in the six main committees, as well as other United Nations bodies.

Agenda 
The agenda for the 75th session, as approved by the General Committee, is as follows:

 Promotion of sustained economic growth and sustainable development in accordance with the relevant resolutions of the General Assembly and recent United Nations conferences
 Maintenance of international peace and security
 Development of Africa 
 Promotion of human rights
 Effective coordination of humanitarian assistance efforts
 Promotion of justice and international law
 Disarmament
 Drug control, crime prevention and combating international terrorism in all its forms and manifestations 
 Organizational, administrative and other matters

New agenda items can also be included in this list if proposed by Member States. This is done via a formal submission of an agenda item by letter, which must be accompanied by an explanatory memorandum. However, this is rare and relies on the support of the General Committee.

General debate 

Each member of the General Assembly will have a representative speaking about issues concerning their country and the hopes for the coming year as to what the UNGA will do. This is an opportunity for the member states to opine on international issues of their concern. The General Debate will occur from the 22 of September until 29 September 2020.

The order of speakers is given first to member states, then observer states and supranational bodies. Any other observers entities will have a chance to speak at the end of the debate, if they so choose. Speakers will be put on the list in the order of their request, with special consideration for ministers and other government officials of similar or higher rank. According to the rules in place for the General Debate, the statements should be in of the United Nations official languages of Arabic, Chinese, English, French, Russian or Spanish, and will be translated by the United Nations translators. Each speaker is requested to provide 20 advance copies of their statements to the conference officers to facilitate translation and to be presented at the podium.

References 

2020 in the United Nations
Sessions of the United Nations General Assembly